The Remøy Bridge is a bridge from connecting the islands of Leinøya and Remøya in the municipality of Herøy in Møre og Romsdal county, Norway. The bridge carries the county highway 18 over the Nordre Vaulen strait.

The  bridge opened in 1967. The bridge is part of a network of bridges that connect all the main islands of the municipality of Herøy.

See also
Runde Bridge
Herøy Bridge
Nerlandsøy Bridge
List of bridges in Norway
List of bridges in Norway by length
List of bridges
List of bridges by length

References

External links
Road Viaducts & Bridges in Norway

Sunnmøre
Bridges in Møre og Romsdal
Bridges completed in 1967